Lampropeltis leonis, known as the Nuevo León kingsnake or variable kingsnake, is a species of colubrid snake endemic to northeastern Mexico.

References

leonis
Snakes of North America
Reptiles of Mexico
Endemic fauna of Northeastern Mexico
Reptiles described in 1893
Taxa named by Albert Günther